Glover may refer to:

A maker of gloves

Places
In the United States:
Glover, Missouri
Glover, North Dakota
Glover, Vermont, a New England town
Glover (CDP), Vermont, the main village in the town
Glover, Wisconsin
Glover Bluff crater, an impact crater in Wisconsin
Glover's Rock, New York, the rock where George Washington and John Glover stood during the Battle of Pell's Point in the American Revolutionary War

Other uses
Glover (surname)
Glover (video game)
Yeovil Town F.C., an association football club nicknamed the "Glovers"